Kévin Ramon Rimane (born 23 February 1991) is a French Guianan professional footballer who plays as a center-back for  club Cholet and the French Guiana national team.

Club career

Early career 
Rimane trained in the academy programs at Paris Saint-Germain, but signed his first contract, for three years, with Boulogne in the summer of 2011. He played his first professional match for Boulogne on 5 August 2011 against Angers in Ligue 2.

Paris Saint-Germain 
Out of contract at Boulogne in 2014, he returned to Paris Saint-Germain B to grow with the reserve and attempt to advance. His faithfulness and his efforts were rewarded with inclusion in the first-team squad for Paris Saint-Germain against Saint-Étienne on 31 January 2016. He started and played the full 90 minutes for Paris Saint-Germain as they defeated Monaco 4–0 in the 2018 Trophée des Champions on 4 August 2018.

Loan to Istra 1961 
On 7 February 2019, he signed a loan contract to the end of 2018–19 season with Croatian club NK Istra 1961.

Hermannstadt 
Rimane joined Hermannstadt in August 2019.

Bastia-Borgo 
On 2 December 2021, Rimane signed with Championnat National club Bastia-Borgo.

Cholet
On 24 May 2022, Rimane joined Cholet for the 2022–23 season.

International career 
Rimane is an international for the French Guiana national team.

Career statistics

Club

International

As of 9 September 2019. French Guiana score listed first, score column indicates score after each Rimane goal.

Honours 
Paris Saint-Germain

 Ligue 1: 2015–16, 2017–18, 2018–19
 Trophée des Champions: 2018
French Guiana
Caribbean Cup third place: 2017

References

Living people
1991 births
Association football central defenders
Association football defenders
French Guianan footballers
French Guiana international footballers
French Guianan expatriate footballers
Paris Saint-Germain F.C. players
US Boulogne players
NK Istra 1961 players
FC Hermannstadt players
US Torcy players
FC Bastia-Borgo players
SO Cholet players
Championnat National 2 players
Ligue 2 players
Championnat National players
Championnat National 3 players
Ligue 1 players
Croatian Football League players
Liga I players
Régional 1 players
2017 CONCACAF Gold Cup players
Expatriate footballers in Croatia
Expatriate footballers in Romania
Sportspeople from Cayenne